Velociraptor! is the fourth studio album by English rock band Kasabian, released on 16 September 2011. The album has been described as expanding upon the neo-psychedelic feel of their previous album West Ryder Pauper Lunatic Asylum with a stronger emphasis on experimental song structures and instrumentation. It was released to critical acclaim and became their third UK number-one album, its lead single "Days Are Forgotten", first released in Belgium on 12 August, and in the United Kingdom on 9 September 2011 - debuted at number 28 on the UK Singles Chart. Their song was featured in EA Sports game, FIFA 12 with "Switchblade Smiles".

Miscellany
"Switchblade Smiles" was made available as a free download to anybody who pre-ordered the album from the band's official website store from 7 June 2011. The track is also available as a free download on the band's fanpage on Facebook.

Q magazine listed "Re-Wired" as the number 1 track to download in their October 2011 issue.

The album cover is an edited picture of all four band members covered in feathers (as Velociraptors were traditionally feathery) and screaming, edited from the "Switchblade Smiles" music video. Music videos for "Days Are Forgotten", "Re-Wired", "Goodbye Kiss", "Man of Simple Pleasures" and "Neon Noon" were also produced and released through the band's Vevo page on YouTube.

"Acid Turkish Bath (Shelter from the Storm)" was used in the end credits to the movie "Killer Elite".

Critical reception

Velociraptor! received a strong critical reception and is often considered by fans and critics to be one of the band's strongest albums. On Metacritic, Velociraptor! has the band's highest rating with a score of 79 out of 100 based on 23 reviews, indicating "generally favorable reviews". Their previous best album score was 68, held by West Ryder Pauper Lunatic Asylum (2009).

NME stated that Kasabian have lived up to expectations and believe the album is a huge step up from their previous albums. Antiquiet gave it 4 1/2 stars out of 5 and declared that "Kasabian has found a way to channel everything you love about The Rolling Stones, Led Zeppelin and Radiohead while still keeping the unique sound that sets them apart from the contemporaries like Coldplay, Muse and The Killers."

Commercial performance
The album debuted at number one on the UK Albums Chart, selling over 90,000 copies in its first week. In 2011, Velociraptor! sold 279,000 copies in the UK. With little support from Sony Music, the album failed to chart in the United States.

Track listing

Personnel

 Kasabian
Tom Meighan – lead vocals (all tracks except 4, 6 and 11), backing vocals (tracks 4, 6 and 11)
Sergio Pizzorno – lead and rhythm guitars, backing vocals (all tracks except 4, 6 and 11), lead vocals (tracks 4, 6 and 11), co-lead vocals (track 5 and 10), synthesizer, bass guitar, production
Chris Edwards – bass guitar
Ian Matthews – drums

 Additional musicians
Jay Mehler – guitar
Sandris Skyrimš – guitar
Tim Carter – guitar, percussion
Ben Kealey – keyboards
Dan Ralph Martin – guitar, percussion (tracks 4 and 9)
Gary Alesbrook – trumpet (tracks 1, 2, 4, 5 and 8)
Mat Coleman – trombone (tracks 1, 2, 4, 5 and 8)
Andrew Kinsman – saxophone (tracks 1, 2, 4, 5 and 8)
London Metropolitan Orchestra – strings (tracks 1, 4, 6 and 8)
Jessica Dannheisser – orchestration
Andy Brown – conducting

 Technical personnel
Dan the Automator – production
Tim Carter, Joe Kearns – engineering
Stephen McLaughlin – production
Aitor Throup – design and art direction
Neil Bedford – photography

Charts and certifications

Weekly charts

Year-end charts

Certifications

Release history

References

2011 albums
Albums produced by Dan the Automator
Albums produced by Sergio Pizzorno
Kasabian albums